The Eparchy of Pathanamthitta is a Syro-Malankara Catholic Church ecclesiastical territory or eparchy of the Catholic Church in Kerala, India. The diocese was created by Pope Benedict XVI on 25 January 2010. Yoohanon Chrysostom became the first and current eparch. St. Peter’s Malankara Catholic Church in the episcopal see of Pathanamthitta serves as the cathedral church. The Eparchy of Pathanamthitta is a suffragan eparchy in the ecclesiastical province of the metropolitan Archeparchy of Trivandrum.

History 
The Syro-Malankara Catholics are one of the oldest Saint Thomas Christians centered in Kerala, India. In the 16th century, the Church in the West came in contact with the Indian Church through the Portuguese merchants and missionaries. But the relationship was fragile and several conflicts evolved among them, which later resulted in the Coonan Cross Oath. The majority of them restored ecclesial relationship with the Portuguese hierarchy (Syro-Malabar Catholic Church) and the rest formed themselves into an independent ecclesial community and gradually got into an ecclesial relationship with the ancient Church of the Antioch. Later, on 20 September 1930, a group headed by Geevarghese Ivanios lead the reunion movement and returned to the Catholic Church. The Metropolitan Eparchy of Trivandrum was inaugurated on 11 May 1933 and Geevarghese Ivanios was installed as its first Metropolitan. To cope up with the tremendous growth of the church the Major Archeparchy of Trivandrum was ramified and a new Eparchy of Pathanamthitta was formed.

Statistics 
As of 2021 there are 100 parishes in the Diocese and the number of priests incardinated is 120.The diocese has about 80 seminarians pursuing different grades in their priestly formation.The diocese possesses 10,000 families of Catholic faithful in its territory. A bigger part of the malankara global diaspora comes from this diocese. The diocesan area is basically hilly in nature including a considerable number of tribal colonies. The Exarcate of the United States got its first bishop Thomas Eusebius from the Sacred Heart Malankara Catholic Church in Mylapra the Eparch of Pathanamthitta.

Curia members

The Heads of Various Apostolic Services

Parishes

Gallery

References

External links
 Official Website of the Eparchy of Pathanamthitta
 Syro-Malankara Catholic Church Website

Syro-Malankara Catholic dioceses
Dioceses in Kerala
Dioceses established in the 21st century
Christian organizations established in 2010
2010 establishments in Kerala
Churches in Pathanamthitta district